Nicknamed "The Hiwassee Route" for a scenic portion of the railroad along the Hiawassee River, the Atlanta, Knoxville and Northern Railway was chartered in 1896 as a successor to the Marietta and North Georgia Railway, which had entered receivership in 1891.  It was part of a railroad system that ran from the community of Elizabeth near Marietta, Georgia, northward to Murphy in far western North Carolina, and to Delano just south of Etowah in southeast Tennessee.

History
Originally incorporated in 1854 as the Ellijay Railroad after the town of Ellijay, Georgia, it was renamed the Marietta, Canton & Ellijay Railroad, and finally the Marietta and North Georgia Railroad, finally beginning construction in 1874.  Beginning at the Western & Atlantic Railroad in Elizabeth (now within Marietta city limits), it connected through Blackwells, Noonday, Woodstock, Lebanon/Toonigh, Holly Springs, and Canton, taking until 1879 to do so.  It continued to Marble Cliff in 1883, and to Ellijay in 1884.  In 1887, it was completed to Murphy, and merged with the Georgia and North Carolina Railroad, causing another slight name change to the Marietta and North Georgia Railway, rather than the previous "Railroad".

It was converted from three-foot (775mm) narrow gauge to standard gauge as far north as Blue Ridge, Georgia in 1890, and from there to Murphy in 1897.  This also allowed a continuous route from Atlanta, Georgia to Knoxville, Tennessee, with the completion of a route southward from the wye at Etowah/Delano by the Knoxville Southern Railroad, actually a subsidiary of the M&NGR.  This route runs eastward along the Hiwassee River to Farner, Tennessee, then south along the Tennessee side of the North Carolina state line, through Ducktown, then the twin towns of Copperhill, Tennessee and McCaysville, Georgia, then through Epworth before meeting the existing line at Blue Ridge.

In order to meet the construction deadline, engineers designed a double switchback, which required that railcars be brought up or down four at a time to and from the river elevation to make the turn out of or into the valley.  Extremely inefficient and time-consuming, it was replaced by what is known as the Hiwassee Loop, taking trains nearly twice around Bald Mountain, with the train passing over its own tracks on a wooden trestle.  This gave the route the "Hook and Eye Line" nickname, with the "hook" being another switchback in Georgia, and the eye being the loop.  (Both were later bypassed before ceasing original operations.)

Most of the AK&N's stock was purchased by the Louisville and Nashville Railroad in 1902, which gave the L&N a complete route from Atlanta to Cincinnati via Knoxville.  L&N moved its Atlanta division headquarters to Etowah, where the train station now serves as a museum owned by the city.

After CSX Transportation was formed in the 1980s, the old M&NGR/AK&N lines were mostly sold off.  The entire main line from Marietta to Etowah is in use by two companies today, the Georgia Northeastern Railroad for freight from Elizabeth Yard to Ellijay, since 1998 the Blue Ridge Scenic Railway (owned by GNRR) from Blue Ridge to McCaysville, and since 2004 the Tennessee Valley Railroad from Copperhill to Delano.  The Georgia portion north of Ellijay is actually owned by the Georgia Department of transportation having been purchased from the GNRR.  The historic trestle and loop at Bald Mountain were saved by Glen Sprigs Holdings, along with the rest of the railroad from the McMinn/Polk county line all the way to the Tennessee/Georgia State Line, and then leased to the Tennessee Overhill Association. 

Except for the east/west portion along the Hiwassee River, the entire route follows one road, numbered as Georgia 5 and Tennessee 68.

References

External links
Atlanta, Knoxville and Northern Railway (RailGA.com)

Defunct Georgia (U.S. state) railroads
Predecessors of the Louisville and Nashville Railroad
Railway companies established in 1896
Railway companies disestablished in 1902
Defunct North Carolina railroads
Defunct Tennessee railroads
1896 establishments in North Carolina
American companies established in 1896
1902 mergers and acquisitions
1896 establishments in Georgia (U.S. state)
1902 disestablishments in Georgia (U.S. state)